B. M. Robinson was an American politician, who was the sixteenth Mayor of Orlando from 1902 to 1904.

References

Mayors of Orlando, Florida
Year of birth unknown
Year of death unknown